The CAGE questionnaire, the name of which is an acronym of its four questions, is a widely used screening test for problem drinking and potential alcohol problems. The questionnaire takes less than one minute to administer, and is often used in primary care or other general settings as a quick screening tool rather than as an in-depth interview for those who have alcoholism. The CAGE questionnaire does not have a specific intended population, and is meant to find those who drink excessively and need treatment. The CAGE questionnaire is reliable and valid; however, it is not valid for diagnosis of other substance use disorders, although somewhat modified versions of the CAGE questionnaire have been frequently implemented for such a purpose.

Overview 
The CAGE questionnaire asks the following questions:
 Have you ever felt you needed to Cut down on your drinking?
 Have people Annoyed you by criticizing your drinking?
 Have you ever felt Guilty about drinking?
 Have you ever felt you needed a drink first thing in the morning (Eye-opener) to steady your nerves or to get rid of a hangover?

Two "yes" responses indicate that the possibility of alcoholism should be investigated further.

The CAGE questionnaire, among other methods, has been extensively validated for use in identifying alcoholism. CAGE is considered a validated screening technique with high levels of sensitivity and specificity. It has been validated via receiver operating characteristic analysis, establishing its ability to screen for problem drinking behaviors.

History 
The CAGE questionnaire was developed in 1968 at North Carolina Memorial Hospital to combat the paucity of screening measures to detect problem drinking behaviors. The original study, conducted in a general hospital population where 130 patients were randomly selected to partake in an in-depth interview, successfully isolated four questions that make up the questionnaire today due to their ability to detect the sixteen alcoholics from the rest of the patients.

Reliability 
Reliability refers to whether the scores are reproducible. Not all of the different types of reliability apply to the way that the CAGE is typically used. Internal consistency (whether all of the items measure the same construct) is not usually reported in studies of the CAGE; nor is inter-rater reliability (which would measure how similar peoples' responses were if the interviews were repeated again, or different raters listened to the same interview).

Validity
Validity describes the evidence that an assessment tool measures what it was supposed to measure. There are many different ways of checking validity. For screening measures such as the CAGE, diagnostic accuracy and discriminative validity are probably the most useful ways of looking at validity.

*Table from Youngstrom et al., extending Hunsley & Mash, 2008; *indicates new construct or category

Limitations
The CAGE is designed as a self-report questionnaire. It is obvious to the person what the questions are about. Because talking about drinking behavior can be uncomfortable or stigmatized, people's responses may be subject to social desirability bias. The honesty and accuracy of responses may improve if the person trusts the person doing the interview or interpreting the score. Responses also may be more honest when the form is completed online, on a computer, or in other anonymous formats.

Alternatives 
Some alternatives to the CAGE include:

See also
Alcoholism
 AUDIT Questionnaire
 CRAFFT Screening Test
 List of diagnostic classification and rating scales used in psychiatry
 Paddington Alcohol Test
 Severity of Alcohol Dependence Questionnaire
Substance abuse

References

External links
Online version of the CAGE questionnaire
AACAP practice parameters for assessment and treatment of children and adolescents with substance use disorders

Alcohol and health
Drinking culture
Alcohol abuse screening and assessment tools